Guraleus lallemantianus is a species of sea snail, a marine gastropod mollusk in the family Mangeliidae.

Description
The length of the shell attains 12 mm. Two of the revolving lines more prominent, ridge-like. The color of the shell is yellowish brown, or light reddish brown.

Distribution
This marine species is endemic to Australia and can be found off South Australia, Victoria and Tasmania.

References

 Crosse, H. & Fischer, P. 1865. Description d'espèces nouvelles d'Australie provenant dela collection de M. Geo French Angas. Journal de Conchyliologie 13: 422–429, pl. 11, figs 1–7
 Angas, G.F. 1865. On the marine molluscan fauna of the Province of South Australia, with a list of all the species known up to the present time, together with remarks on their habitats and distribution, etc. Proceedings of the Zoological Society of London 1865: 155-"180" (=190)
 Angas, G.F. 1877. A further list of additional species of marine Mollusca to be included in the fauna of Port Jackson and the coasts of New South Wales. Proceedings of the Zoological Society of London 1877: 178–194
 Verco, J.C. 1909. Notes on South Australian marine Mollusca with descriptions of new species. Part XII. Transactions of the Royal Society of South Australia 33: 293–342

External links
  Tucker, J.K. 2004 Catalog of recent and fossil turrids (Mollusca: Gastropoda). Zootaxa 682:1–1295.
 Biolib.cz : image of Guraleus asper

lallemantianus
Gastropods described in 1865
Gastropods of Australia